The 18th season of Law & Order premiered with a two part episode on NBC on January 2, 2008, and concluded on May 21, 2008. This was the final season to feature Jesse L. Martin until his departure from the series as Anthony Anderson plays his role in seasons 18-21.

Production
On May 13, 2007, NBC renewed Law & Order for an 18th season of 22 episodes as part of a deal made by series creator Dick Wolf and NBC. Though the series was originally scheduled to air on Sundays as a midseason replacement for NBC Sunday Night Football, TV Guide reported on December 4, 2007, that Law & Order would debut instead on Wednesday, January 2, 2008. 

René Balcer, who had developed and produced spinoff Law & Order: Criminal Intent, returned to Law & Order as executive producer. Production of season 18 was interrupted by the 2007 Writers Guild of America strike. When Balcer and the rest of the writing staff participated in the work stoppage, the mid-season delay meant that the season only had 18 episodes instead of the scheduled 22.

Cast and crew changes
In May 2007, cast member Fred Thompson departed the series to return to politics, with reports saying he would seek the Republican nomination for the 2008 U.S. presidential election. His character, District Attorney Arthur Branch, was replaced in that function by Sam Waterston's Jack McCoy, with McCoy being promoted to Branch's vacant seat after serving as Executive Assistant District Attorney since the resignation of his predecessor Benjamin Stone. Since this move required that a new character be added to the series, the writers created the role of EADA Michael Cutter and British actor Linus Roache was brought in to portray him.

Because of the equal-time rule, which requires that broadcasters treat legally qualified political candidates equally in regard to air time, NBC announced in July 2007 that it would not broadcast any episode of Law & Order in which Thompson appeared after September 1. Thompson officially declared his intention to seek nomination on September 5, 2007, when he appeared on The Tonight Show with Jay Leno.

Milena Govich, who played Detective Nina Cassady, also did not return to the series after joining the cast one year earlier following the departure of Dennis Farina (Joe Fontana). She was replaced by Jeremy Sisto, who had guest starred as a defense attorney in the 17th season finale, as Detective Ed Green's new partner Cyrus Lupo.

Rounding out the list of departures was Jesse L. Martin, who announced he was leaving the series after portraying Det. Ed Green since 1999. Martin, who was scheduled to appear in only 13 episodes this season, announced the move in February 2008 and made his final appearance in "Burn Card". Anthony Anderson, who made his debut as Detective Kevin Bernard in the same episode, was then added to the cast. This remained the main cast until the end of the series, and continued with the show into the reboot, 12 years later.

Cast

Main cast
 Jesse L. Martin as Senior Detective Ed Green (episodes 1-14)
 Jeremy Sisto as Junior / Senior Detective Cyrus Lupo
 Anthony Anderson as Junior Kevin Bernard (Episode 15-18)
 S. Epatha Merkerson as Lieutenant Anita Van Buren
 Linus Roache as Executive Assistant District Attorney Michael Cutter
 Alana de la Garza as Assistant District Attorney Connie Rubirosa
 Sam Waterston as Interim District Attorney Jack McCoy

Recurring cast
 Carolyn McCormick as Dr. Elizabeth Olivet

Episodes

Notes

 S. Epatha Merkerson has a different introductory image in the first three episodes. Afterwards, it's swapped back to the previous one of seasons 9-17 for unknown reasons.
 Jesse L. Martin, Sam Waterston, and Alana De La Garza's introductory images have changed.

References

External links

Episode guide from NBC.com

18
2008 American television seasons